Xishuangbanna railway station is a railway station in Jinghong, Xishuangbanna Dai Autonomous Prefecture, Yunnan, China. It opened with the Yuxi–Mohan railway on 3 December 2021. 

It is located close to Xishuangbanna Gasa International Airport, but isn't directly connected.

References

Railway stations in Yunnan
Railway stations in China opened in 2021